Cracken at Critical is a novel by Brian W. Aldiss published in 1987.

Plot summary
Cracken at Critical is a novel in which a brief framing narrative, "The Mannerheim Symphony" encloses two mini-novels, "The Impossible Smile" (1965) and "Equator" (1958).

Reception
Dave Langford reviewed Cracken at Critical for White Dwarf #95, and stated that "Note the careful contrast between 'Cracken's' sloppy wish-fulfilment endings and the bleak loophole which Aldiss-1987 considers the happiest way out."

Reviews
Review by Gwyneth Jones (1987) in Foundation, #41 Winter 1987, (1987)
Review by Jon Wallace (1954 -) (1987) in Vector 141

References

1987 novels